Vladimir Vyacheslavovich Khozin (born 3 July 1989) is a Russian professional footballer who plays as a right-back for FC Yenisey Krasnoyarsk.

Club career
Khozin made his professional debut in the Russian Premier League for FC Rostov on 11 November 2007 in a game against FC Amkar Perm.

On 9 January 2014, Khozin signed for Ural Yekaterinburg.

In February 2016 Khozin injured his collarbone in a friendly against Sheriff Tiraspol. Whilst recovering from surgery to fix his collarbone, Khozin suffered an injury to his hip that subsequently lead to 2.5 years out of football recovering. Upon his return to training with Ural in the summer of 2018, Khozin was loaned to FC Ararat-Armenia until the end of 2018.

Career statistics

Club

Notes

References

External links
 

1989 births
Sportspeople from Rostov-on-Don
Living people
Russian footballers
Russia youth international footballers
Russia national football B team footballers
Association football defenders
FC Rostov players
FC Moscow players
PFC Krylia Sovetov Samara players
FC Torpedo Moscow players
FC Spartak Vladikavkaz players
FC Ural Yekaterinburg players
FC Ararat-Armenia players
FC Nizhny Novgorod (2015) players
FC Chayka Peschanokopskoye players
FC Shakhter Karagandy players
FC Yenisey Krasnoyarsk players
Russian Premier League players
Russian First League players
Armenian Premier League players
Kazakhstan Premier League players
Russian expatriate footballers
Expatriate footballers in Armenia
Russian expatriate sportspeople in Armenia
Expatriate footballers in Kazakhstan
Russian expatriate sportspeople in Kazakhstan